The 2005 World Figure Skating Championships were held at the Luzhniki Sports Palace in Moscow, Russia from March 14 to 20. Medals were awarded in the disciplines of men's singles, ladies' singles, pair skating, and ice dancing.

The 2005 Worlds was the primary means of deciding the number of entries each country would have to the Olympics.

Medal table

Competition notes
Due to the large number of participants, the men's and ladies' qualifying groups were split into groups A and B.

The compulsory dance was the Midnight Blues.

Results

Men

Ladies

Pairs

Ice dancing

External links

 
 Lambiel wins
 https://www.washingtonpost.com/wp-dyn/articles/A45001-2005Mar17.html?nav=rss_sports/leaguesandsports/olympics
 Slutskaya wins

World Figure Skating Championships
World Figure Skating Championships
World Figure Skating Championships
International figure skating competitions hosted by Russia
Sports competitions in Moscow
March 2005 sports events in Russia
2005 in Moscow